Andrea Rose Russett (born June 27, 1995) is an Internet personality active on Snapchat, Instagram, and YouTube. In 2020 Russett released her first music, making her a published singer-songwriter.

Early life 
Russett was born in Fort Wayne, Indiana to Mark (William) and Jacqui Russett, who are both graphic designers. She has one sister (Nethu), Anna, and one brother, Anthony.

She attended Bishop Dwenger, a private Catholic high school, until her junior year, when she moved to California and began attending an online school. However, she left the program during her final year, saying "everybody learns differently and I don't learn by reading and writing a report. I need to be doing something to learn."

Career 
In 2009 during her early teens, Russett began broadcasting on YouTube when she created a music video entry for a contest to meet Justin Bieber. Although her entry didn't win, it went viral and launched her career.

In 2012 she started her first job, working as a nighttime radio DJ in Fort Wayne, Indiana and becoming the youngest nationally syndicated radio host in the country.

In her junior year of high school, she moved to California after signing a contract with Fullscreen.

In 2013, Russett began designing her own clothing line, FLAWD Clothing. (As of Aug 2019, the clothing website no longer exists, and social media accounts for the line have been inactive since Jun 2015.)

Since achieving YouTube fame, Russett has appeared in several movies including Expelled (2014), Lovesick (2016), and Sickhouse (2016). Sickhouse is a thriller film that was initially released in brief increments via her Snapchat account. She also attended a few VidCon events, for meet-and-greets with her fans.

Since then, Russett has changed her path of career onto music. She released her first song, Darkest Hour, in October 2020. The second song, Get Out Alive, premiered on YouTube in December the same year. She started a Twitch account in 2022.

Personal life
On September 21, 2018, Russett came out as bisexual through a series of tweets on Twitter.

Filmography

Film

TV

Music

References

External links
 
 

1995 births
Actresses from Indiana
American women bloggers
American bloggers
American YouTubers
American women DJs
Comedy YouTubers
LGBT people from Indiana
LGBT YouTubers
Lifestyle YouTubers
Living people
Women video bloggers
YouTube vloggers
Songwriters from Indiana
Musicians from California
21st-century American women
20th-century LGBT people
21st-century LGBT people
LGBT DJs
Musicians from Fort Wayne, Indiana
Actors from Fort Wayne, Indiana